Igbon may refer to:
Alan Igbon (1952–2020), British actor
Igbon Island, island and barangay of Concepcion, Philippines